Just 1 Page (J1P) was charity comic linked to the United Kingdom's Comic Festival and Comic Expo comic book conventions in Bristol, SW England. Single-page contributions were donated by a range of professional and amateur artists and writers, including many notable UK creators. Just 1 Page, produced by Adrian "Ade" Brown, published four issues, each one on a specific theme, in the period 2001–2006.

The first Just 1 Page comic, published in 2001, raised about £500 for the Comic Book Legal Defense Fund and Comic Relief. Just 1 Page 2 (2003) raised £800 for the Trinity Hospice in Clapham. Just 1 Page 3 (2005) raised £600 for Childline. 

Notable contributions were:
 A picture of a race between DC's Flash, Marvel's Quicksilver and Road Runner from Looney Tunes, drawn by Alan Davis.
 A page where Steve Gerber's Howard the Duck and Destroyer Duck appear at a comics convention. This was drawn by Phil Winslade and was used by Gerber and Winslade in preparation for the Marvel Max return of Howard the Duck in 2002. 
 Three statues by Jesse Farrell: one of Alan Moore & Kevin O'Neill's The League of Extraordinary Gentlemen; one of Paul Grist's Jack Staff and a third of Shaun of the Dead battling a zombie.

Connected to the Just 1 Page project was the 24 Minute Comic, a high-speed variation of the 24-hour comic, in which twenty-four artists collaborated by drawing a page each during a twenty-four-minute period. The first 24 Minute Comic, which included such contributors as Roger Langridge, Gary Northfield, and David Baillie, was produced for the 2005 UK Web & Mini Comix Thing. A second 24 Minute Comic was also later produced.

Issues

References

Notes

Sources 
 J1P4 @ Comics International 
 J1P3 @ Millarworld's Magazine by Dan Fish
 J1P2 interview @ Newsarama by Chris Arrant.
 J1P3 news @ Comic Book ResourcesLying in the Gutters, March 2005. Rich Johnston. 
 @ Comic Book ResourcesLying in the Gutters, August 2005. Rich Johnston.

External links
 Just 1 Page website (about the project and samples of the art)
 Just1Page on web.archive.org
 Both 24 Minute Comics online

2001 comics debuts
2006 comics endings
Comics publications
Comics anthologies